Jessica Ashley Shepley (born April 4, 1983) is a Canadian female professional golfer currently playing on the Symetra Tour and on the LPGA Tour.

Personal
Shepley was born in Owen Sound, Ontario on April 4, 1983, to Bret and Lori Shepley. She resides in Oakville, Ontario.

College
Shepley played college golf for four years at the University of Tennessee.  She graduated with a bachelor's degree in journalism.

Professional
Shepley turned professional in 2005, and joined the Futures Tour on January 28, 2005. In 2006, she played on both the Futures Tour and on the CN Canadian Women's Tour. She finished seventh on the Futures Tour money list in 2008 which earned her limited status on the LPGA Tour in 2009.

Professional wins (1)

Futures Tour wins (1)

External links

Jessica Shepley at the Symetra Tour official site
Profile at the University of Tennessee sports site

Canadian female golfers
Tennessee Volunteers women's golfers
LPGA Tour golfers
Golfing people from Ontario
Sportspeople from Owen Sound
People from Oakville, Ontario
1983 births
Living people